The Bhopal School of Social Science (popularly known as BSSS) is located in the city of lakes, Bhopal, Madhya Pradesh. BSSS was established in 1972 by the founding chairman of the college, the then Archbishop of Bhopal, Dr. Eugene D'souza, in response to the felt need of the time for a broad based, job oriented curriculum with focus on social service and entrepreneurship. It is an autonomous college and accredited A grade by NAAC.

BSSS Rhythm, a website for sharing scheduled audio and video library and Photo gallery, was launched on 15 Aug 2016 by Avia Consultancy Services.
 

Initially known for its Social Sciences and Management courses, which are indeed its novelty but it grew and diversified to meet the changing needs of time and education, with the introduction of courses in B. Com, B.B.A, B.C.A., and many others and from 2018 College started B.Sc. and B.P.E.S courses Also. The Undergraduate programmes were further developed with the addition of Post Graduate courses in social work, English literature, Commerce and Business Administration. The college offers an International MBA through collaboration with Assumption University, Bangkok in keeping with our sensitivity to global needs. This is a twinning programme where students do part of their studies at BSSS and go on to complete the programme at The Assumption University.

Administration
 Dr. Leo Cornelio - Chairman & President
 Rev. Fr. Cyriac James - Treasurer
 Rev. Fr. Mathew V C - Vice President
 Rev. Fr. Benito John - Member
 Rev. Fr. Ronald Cardosa - Member
 Rev. Fr. Maria Stephen - Member
 Rev. Fr. Thobias Minj - Member
 Rev. Fr. Ishwardas Minj - Member
 Rev. Fr. Dr. John P.J. - Secretary

Head Of Department

Department of Education - Ms. Sheena Thomas
 Department of English  - Dr Supriya Mandloi
 Department of Humanities  - Mrs. Naina Singh
 Department of Management  - Mrs Alpa Ghosh
 Department of Commerce - Dr. Amit Kumar Nag
 Department of Computers - Dr. Prabha Biju
 Department of Social Work - Mr. Abraham K. Varghese
 Department of Economics - Dr. Perminder Kaur

Courses

Under Graduate Courses
 B.P.E.S
 B.A
 B.A (Management)
 B.A (Social Work) Hons.
 B.A (Economics) Hons.
 B.A (English Literature) Hons.
 B.Com. (Honors)
 B.Com. (Insurance)
 B.Com. (Computer)
 B.Com. (Tourism)
 B.Com. (Foreign Trade)
 B.Com. (Economics)
 B.Com. (Taxation)
B.Com Advertising
 B.C.A
 B.B.A
 B.Ed
B.Sc

Post Graduate Diploma Courses
 PG Diploma in Computer Application (PGDCA)

Post Graduate Courses
 M.A (English Literature)
 M.A (Social Work)
 M.A (Sociology)
 M.A (Economics)
M.A (Psychology)
M.A (Political Science)
 M.Com (Management & Taxation)
 M.Sc (Computer Science)
M.S.W.

Bhopal School of Social Sciences has ties with Assumption University, Bangkok for twinning programs in:
 MBA
 MS in Technology Management
 MS in Tourism Management
 Masters in Counseling Psychology.

Many students have taken advantage of this programme and after doing 6 months of training at BSSS they have attended Assumption University, Bangkok, where they completed their programme. The management and faculty of AU, Bangkok has rated the performance of BSSS students as Good in academics, inter-personal relations, public speaking and extracurricular activities. An effort to consolidate the ties between BSSS and Assumption University was made by sending Dr. Sr. Johnsy, Head Of Department (Commerce) and Dr. Vinay Mishra, Head Of Department (Humanities). The college also hosted guests from Assumption University in the college.
4

Campus

BSSS is situated on the fringe of the BHEL Township, opposite to the Divisional Railway Manager(DRM) Office, Bhopal, and half a kilometer from the Habibganj Railway station. The strategic location makes it easily accessible from the BHEL Township, Bhopal City as well as the University.
.

Academic Blocks

The academic blocks are divided into various department. A few blocks were added later owing to the increase in the number of students being enrolled. Currently, there are various department where classes, faculty offices and other administrative entities are located. The classes also have audio-visual facility.

Library

College has a library.

Hostel

BSSS also has hostel facility for girls. Hostel is within the campus.

Computer Center

The institute has one of the finest computing infrastructure with 24-hour Internet connectivity and 100+ PCs. The campus is also fully WiFi enabled.

Auditorium

The Auditorium is situated within the academic blocks. It is capable of seating nearly 500 people and plays host to most of the functions and guest lectures held at the college.

Sports

BSSS has facilities for cricket, football, tennis, basketball, volleyball, badminton, table tennis etc. College has also hosted several cricket, football and basketball tournaments.

Events

Traditional Day
India is one of the most diverse countries in the world when it comes to culture and religions. As a result, the celebration of religious festivals has always been an important part of Indian culture. Indians enjoy celebrating their differences and sharing their traditions with others and due to the variety of different groups in India, there is a festival celebrated most days out of the year in some part of the country. Traditional Day is observed as a celebration of India's diverse culture. It is a day designated for people to come in traditional attire from their home state, or specific culture of their choice.

References

Universities and colleges in Bhopal